Durriya Shabbir (born 26 July 1967) is an Indian born Canadian woman cricketer. She played for Canada at the 2013 ICC Women's World Twenty20 Qualifier. 

She played a key role in Canada's qualification during the 2013 ICC Women's World Twenty20 Qualifier after scoring 153 runs in the ICC Americas Qualifier tournament.

References

External links 
 
 Profile at CricHQ

1967 births
Living people
Canadian women cricketers
Canadian sportspeople of Indian descent
Indian emigrants to Canada
Cricketers from Chennai
Sportswomen from Tamil Nadu